János Reznák (12 December 1930 – 11 June 1988) was a Hungarian wrestler. He competed at the 1960 Summer Olympics and the 1964 Summer Olympics.

References

External links
 

1930 births
1988 deaths
Hungarian male sport wrestlers
Olympic wrestlers of Hungary
Wrestlers at the 1960 Summer Olympics
Wrestlers at the 1964 Summer Olympics
People from Cegléd
Sportspeople from Pest County
20th-century Hungarian people